Parker Michael Markel (born September 15, 1990) is an American professional baseball pitcher who is currently a free agent. He has previously played in MLB for the Seattle Mariners, Pittsburgh Pirates, and Oakland Athletics.

Career
Markel attended Mountain Ridge High School in Glendale, Arizona. He was drafted by the Detroit Tigers in the 32nd round of the 2009 MLB draft but did not sign. He attended Yavapai College in Prescott, Arizona in 2010.

Tampa Bay Rays
He was drafted by the Tampa Bay Rays in the 39th round of the 2010 MLB draft, and signed with them.

Markel spent the 2010 through 2016 seasons in the Rays organization.  During his time with them, he played for the Gulf Coast Rays, Hudson Valley Renegades, Bowling Green Hot Rods, Charlotte Stone Crabs, Montgomery Biscuits, and the Durham Bulls.

Lotte Giants
He signed with the Lotte Giants of the KBO League during the 2016 offseason, but asked for and was given his release on March 27, 2017, after appearing in only one exhibition game for the Giants.

Arizona Diamondbacks
Markel signed a minor league contract with the Arizona Diamondbacks on December 18, 2017, but was released on March 25, 2018.

Sioux City Explorers
He signed with the Sioux City Explorers of the independent baseball American Association, and spent the 2018 season with them.

Seattle Mariners
Markel signed a minor league contract with the Seattle Mariners on September 28, 2018. He opened the 2019 season with the Arkansas Travelers and the Tacoma Rainiers. On May 12, Markel's contract was selected and he was called up to the major leagues for the first time. He made his major league debut that day versus the Boston Red Sox. On July 23, 2019, Markel was designated for assignment.

Pittsburgh Pirates
On July 27, 2019, Markel was claimed off waivers by the Pittsburgh Pirates.

Los Angeles Angels
On October 31, 2019, Markel was traded to the Los Angeles Angels in exchange for cash considerations. He was designated for assignment on February 10, 2020. Markel did not play in a game in 2020 due to the cancellation of the minor league season because of the COVID-19 pandemic. He became a free agent on November 2, 2020.

San Diego Padres
On November 17, 2020, Markel signed a minor league contract with the San Diego Padres organization. Markel spent the year with the Triple-A El Paso Chihuahuas, posting a 4.42 ERA with 91 strikeouts across 41 appearances. On September 22, 2021, Markel was released by San Diego.

Oakland Athletics
On March 5, 2022, Markel signed a minor league contract with the Oakland Athletics. The Athletics promoted Markel to the major leagues on May 29. He made 3 appearances out of the bullpen, giving up just 1 hit over 3 scoreless innings of work. Markel was designated for assignment on June 7, 2022, in order to make room for Matt Davidson on the team's 40-man roster.

Chicago White Sox
On June 8, 2022, Markel was claimed off waivers by the Chicago White Sox and optioned to the Triple-A Charlotte Knights. He was sent outright on July 29, 2022. He was released on August 31, 2022.

Personal life
Markel requested his release from the Lotte Giants in 2017 due to anxiety issues. He was out of professional baseball for the rest of 2017, and worked for a time at a Lululemon store and for a hot air balloon company. Markel suffered a concussion and a ruptured right eardrum after being struck by a batted ball during live batting practice, in spring training with the Sioux City Explorers in 2018.

References

External links

Living people
1990 births
Baseball players from California
Sportspeople from Newport Beach, California
Major League Baseball pitchers
Seattle Mariners players
Pittsburgh Pirates players
Oakland Athletics players
Yavapai Roughriders baseball players
Gulf Coast Rays players
Hudson Valley Renegades players
Bowling Green Hot Rods players
Charlotte Stone Crabs players
Montgomery Biscuits players
Durham Bulls players
Sioux City Explorers players
Arkansas Travelers players
Tacoma Rainiers players
Indianapolis Indians players
El Paso Chihuahuas players
Las Vegas Aviators players
American expatriate baseball players in South Korea